This is a list of hospitals in Indonesia, including clinics. As of 2019, there were 2,813 hospitals of all types in Indonesia, 63.5% of which are run by private organisations. In 2012, according to data from the Ministry of Health of Indonesia, there were 2,454 hospitals around the country, with a total of 305,242 beds, a figure of 0.9 bed per 1,000 inhabitants. According to the World Health Organization, there were 5,734 hospitals with 338,370 beds in 2014.  Most hospitals are in urban areas.  In 2014, 53 percent of the hospitals were in the Java-Bali region were 59 percent of the population lived.

Medical centers

Hospitals

Clinics 
 Clinic Hosana Medika Cibitung, Bekasi
 Clinic Hosana Medika, Bekasi
 Clinic Hosana Medika Lippo, Bekasi
 Clinic Hosana Medika Tambun, Bekasi
 Clinic Renicha Putra Cikarang, Bekasi
 Clinic Yayasan Mulya Medika, Bekasi Timor
 Global Doctor Jakarta Clinic, South Jakarta
 Graha Medika Hospital, Jakarta
 International Medical Clinic - Bali, Bali
 International Medical Clinic - Jakarta 1
 International Medical Clinic - Jakarta 2
 Kimia Farma Clinic, Bali
 Klinik Amanah, Bogor
 Klinik Asih, Batam
 Klinik dan RB Bhakti Asih, Tangerang
 Klinik Dr. Zakky Mach Fuad, Bekasi
 Klinik Fajar Medika, Bekasi
 Klinik Galuh Pakuan, Bandung
 Klinik Grace Batu Aji, Batam
 Klinik Grace Marina, Batam
 Klinik Grace Nagoya, Batam
 Klinik Medifarma Pondok Cabe, Pamulang
 Klinik Medis Pusara Gresik, Gresik

References

 

Hospitals

 List
Indonesia
Indonesia
Indonesia